The 2013–14 Houston Baptist Huskies women's basketball team represented Houston Baptist University in the 2013–14 college basketball season. This was head coach Donna Finnie's first season as head coach at HBU. The Huskies played their home games at the Sharp Gymnasium and are members of the Southland Conference.

Media
All Houston Baptist games was broadcast online live by Legacy Sports Network (LSN) with audio for all road games and video for all home games.

Roster

Schedule and results

|-
!colspan=9 style="background:#002366; color:#FF7F00;"| Exhibition

|-
!colspan=9 style="background:#FF7F00; color:#002366;"|Regular Season

See also
2013–14 Houston Baptist Huskies men's basketball team

References

Houston Christian Huskies women's basketball seasons
Houston Baptist
Houston Baptist Huskies basketball
Houston Baptist Huskies basketball